Michael F. Kitt (13 September 1914 – 24 December 1974) was an Irish Fianna Fáil politician and long-serving Teachta Dála (TD).

Kitt was born in Mountbellew, County Galway, the son of Thomas Kitt, master of Mountbellew workhouse, and Kathleen Sheehey.

He was elected to Dáil Éireann for the first time at the 1948 general election for the Galway North constituency, but lost his seat at the 1951 general election, and failed to be elected again at the 1954 general election. Kitt was re-elected to Dáil Éireann for Galway North at the 1957 general election, and elsewhere at the next four general elections: for Galway East in 1961 and 1965, and for Galway North-East in 1969 and 1973.

In the wake of the Arms Crisis in May 1970, Kitt was appointed Parliamentary Secretary to the Minister for the Gaeltacht, serving in that position until 1973. He died in 1974, midway through the 20th Dáil.

His son Michael P. Kitt was elected in the subsequent by-election. Kitt's other son, Tom, was a TD from 1987 to 2011. Kitt's daughter, Áine Brady, is also a member of Fianna Fáil and served in the Dáil from 2007 to 2011. Her husband, Gerard Brady, is a former TD.

See also
Families in the Oireachtas

References

1914 births
1974 deaths
Fianna Fáil TDs
Michael F
Members of the 13th Dáil
Members of the 16th Dáil
Members of the 17th Dáil
Members of the 18th Dáil
Members of the 19th Dáil
Members of the 20th Dáil
Politicians from County Galway
Parliamentary Secretaries of the 19th Dáil